Kenny Mitchell (born February 7, 1960 in Stockton, CA) is a former professional boxer.

Amateur career 
Mitchell won the New York Golden Gloves three times. He won the 112 lb Open Championships in 1978, 1979 and 1980. Mitchell was defeated in the 1977 112 lb Sub-Novice Championship by Gino Gelormino. Mitchell trained at the Morrisania Youth Center in 1977 and 1978. In 1979 and 1980 Mitchell trained at the Fort Apache Boys Club. Both Gyms are located in the Bronx, New York.

Professional career 
Mitchell began his career in 1981 and in 1989 captured the Newly Created and vacant WBO super bantamweight title with a win over Julio Gervacio by decision.  He defended the belt once before losing it to Valerio Nati in later in 1989 by disqualification.  In the bout, Mitchell was DQ'ed for illegal use of his head.  The result was initially listed as a technical decision for Nati amidst a lot of controversy, but finally ended up being ruled a DQ.  Mitchell retired in 1995 after being knocked out by Erik Morales.

See also
List of super-bantamweight boxing champions

External links
 

1960 births
Living people
Sportspeople from Stockton, California
Boxers from California
Bantamweight boxers
Super-bantamweight boxers
World super-bantamweight boxing champions
World Boxing Organization champions
American male boxers